Alicia, officially the Municipality of Alicia,  is a 4th class municipality in the province of Bohol, Philippines. According to the 2020 census, it has a population of 24,374 people.

Located  from Tagbilaran, it was formerly part of Mabini and was known as Batuanan (or Batuanon).

Alicia celebrates its town fiesta on 26 July in honor of Saint Joachim.

History

In the mid-19th century Alicia was one of the three largest and oldest towns of Bohol along with Catigbian and Balilihan.  The town was where former followers of Dagohoy were given some land to till, but at the same time could be kept under the watchful eye of Spanish authorities.

In 1829, the year the Dagohoy Rebellion ended, the town was the largest of five such settlements, with over 6000 inhabitants.

In 1949, it became an independent municipality, which was renamed Alicia after Alicia Syquia, the wife of president Elpidio Quirino. She and three of their children were massacred by the Japanese in 1945.

Geography

Barangays
Alicia comprises 15 barangays:

Climate

Demographics

Economy

Education 

 Katipunan Elementary School, in Katipunan, Alicia, Bohol, Philippines. The Alicia Bamboo Ensemble or the Alicia's Musika Kawayan therein is a school-based orchestra, which has received the National Champion Prize (1994, 1996, and 2000) in the National Musical Competition for Young Artists (NAMCYA).

Government

List of former chief executives
List of former mayors of Alicia:
 Pedro Huiso1950–1955
 Exequiel Madriñan
 Leoncio Garcia1956–1959
 Jesus Madriñan1960–1980
 Dominador Molina1980–1987
 Exequiel Madriñan Jr1988–1995
 Basilio Balahay1995–2001
 Bienvenido Molina2001–2007
 Pedro Miasco2007–2010
 Marnilou Ayuban2010–

Gallery

Notable People

Maryo J. de los Reyes, filmmaker

References

External links

 [ Philippine Standard Geographic Code]
Municipality of Alicia

Municipalities of Bohol